These are the results of the men's K-2 10000 metres competition in canoeing at the 1948 Summer Olympics.  The K-2 event is raced by two-man canoe sprint kayaks.

Medalists

Final
The final took place August 11.

References

1948 Summer Olympics official report. p. 312.
Sports-reference.com 1948 K-2 10000 m results

Men's K-2 10000
Men's events at the 1948 Summer Olympics